Šentjungert ( or ) is a settlement in the City Municipality of Celje in eastern Slovenia. It lies on the northwestern outskirts of Celje. The area is part of the traditional region of Styria. It is now included with the rest of the municipality in the Savinja Statistical Region.

Name
The name of the settlement was changed from Sveta Jungert to Šentjungert in 1984.

Church
The local church is dedicated to Saint Cunigunde and belongs to the Parish of Galicija. It dates to the 14th century.

References

External links
Šentjungert on Geopedia

Populated places in the City Municipality of Celje